Chei Byung-yong (born April 25, 1982) is a South Korean professional baseball pitcher currently playing for the SK Wyverns of the KBO League.

References

External links
Career statistics and player information from Korea Baseball Organization

Chei Byung-yong at SK Wyverns Baseball Club 

1982 births
KBO League pitchers
Living people
People from Gunsan
SSG Landers players
South Korean baseball players
Sportspeople from North Jeolla Province